Skanderborg Håndbold is a women's handball club based in  Skanderborg in Jutland, Denmark. The club was founded in 1982 and was the result of a merger between Stilling-Skanderborg and Vrold-Skanderborg Handball Club. 

In 2021, Aarhus Håndbold merged with Skanderborg Håndbold's men's team, and they changed the name to Skanderborg Aarhus Håndbold.

Team
Squad for the 2022-23 season

Goalkeeper
 12  Emma Friberg
 16  Anna Veng Kristensen
Wingers
LW
 17  Steinunn Hansdóttir
 22  Rikke Hoffbeck
RW
 4  Emilie Nørgaard Bech
 18  Melina Kristensen
Pivots
 3  Sarah Kirkeløkke 
 9  Mathilde Storgaard

Back players
LB
 7  Line Berggren Larsen
 5  Lotte Vestergaard
 10  Stine Kristensen
 19  Sofia Bro Stenholt
 21  Emma Gandrup Ernst 
CB
 8  Katrine Larson
 15  Cecilie Mørch Hansen
RB
 6  Anne Berggreen

Technical staff
Staff for the 2022-23 season.
  Head Coach: Jeppe Vestergaard
  Assistant coach: David Langkilde Møller
  Team Leader: Pernille Mikkelsen
  Team Leader: Bent Mikkelsen
  Physiotherapist: Morten Kirk Olesen
  Chiropractor: Anne-Marie Madsen
  Goalkeeping coach: Kent Jæger

Transfers
Transfers for the season 2023-24

Joining
  Laura Holm (LW) (from  Viborg HK)
  Verona Rexhepi (PM) (from own row)

Leaving
  Rikke Hoffbeck (LW) (to  SønderjyskE Håndbold)

Notable former players

  Steinunn Hansdóttir
  Åsa Eriksson
  Kristina Jørgensen
  Trine Knudsen
  Anna Kristensen
  Laura Damgaard
  Sofie Blichert-Toft
  Sofie Alnor
  Mette Brandt Nielsen
  Sofia Deen
  Celine Holst Elkjær
  Stine Holm
  Annika Jakobsen
  Monika Kongsgaard
  Sarah Stougaard
  Amalie Wichmann
  Marie Aamand Sørensen
  Nicoline Olsen
  Edita Nukovic
  Sophie Moth
  Mette Lassen
  Sidsel Mejlvang
  Ida Mikkelsen
  Anna Wierzba

References

Danish handball clubs
Skanderborg Municipality
Handball clubs established in 1982
1982 establishments in Denmark